Fire-raising may refer to:

Legal
Arson, a criminal offence in the United States, England and Wales (where it is now a sub-division of the offence of criminal damage) and elsewhere
Wilful fire raising, a criminal offence under Scots Law not directly equivalent to the English Law offence of arson

Medical
Pyromania, the disorder causing a person to set fires

See also
 Fire making, the process of artificially starting a fire
 Firestarter (disambiguation)